Hebrew mythology may refer to:
Canaanite religion
Jewish mythology

See also
Middle Eastern mythology (disambiguation)
Religion and mythology
Ancient Semitic religion
Panbabylonism